Piz Foraz is a mountain in the Sesvenna Range of the Alps, located south-west of S-charl in the canton of Graubünden.

The south and east sides of the mountain are part of the Swiss National Park.

References

External links
 Piz Foraz on Hikr

Mountains of Switzerland
Mountains of Graubünden
Mountains of the Alps
Alpine three-thousanders